The International Customer Service Institute (TICSI) is an international partnership organisation to enable the recognition and sharing of global best practice in customer service. It was founded in 2005 operating out of London and Dubai and has developed The International Standard for Service Excellence (TISSE).
It has regional Certification Partners in the UK, India, Australia, New Zealand and the Middle East.

See also 
British Standards Institution (BSI)
Canadian Standards Association
Countries in International Organization for Standardization
Deutsches Institut für Normung, German Institute for Standardization (DIN)
European Committee for Standardization (CEN)
International Classification for Standards
Standardization
Standards organization

References

External links 
The International Customer Service Institute

Customer service
International business organizations